The  Revolutionary Marxist Party (RMP) was a political party in Kerala, India. It was found by T.P. Chandrasekharan. It claims to uphold real communist ideologies and maintain internal democracy. It was found after T.P. Chandrasekharan, an ex-CPI (M) leader, was expelled from his party.

Chandrasekharan contested in the Lok Sabha elections of 2009 as its candidate. He was hacked to death by some assailants, believed to be CPI (M) supporters on 4 May 2012. After Chandrasekharan's assassination, his widow K.K. Rema took charge of this party. In 2014, Revolutionary Marxist Party has formed a Left United Front with Socialist Unity Centre of India (Communist) and Marxist Communist Party of India (United) as its allies. She contested from Vatakara constituency in the Kerala Legislative Assembly elections of 2016, but she was defeated. In 2019 Lokshabha election they stood against LDF candidate Jayarajan , so to defeat LDF candidate they gave support to UDF candidate K. Muraleedaran.

Later, around ten minor leftist parties scattered in various parts of India merged with RMP to form Revolutionary Marxist Party of India (RMPI), thus making it a party working in national level.

References

Political parties in Kerala
Communist parties in India
2009 establishments in Kerala
Political parties established in 2009
Communist Party of India (Marxist) breakaway groups